Rapid Heart Pictures is a Canadian film production company owned by prolific filmmaker David DeCoteau. The company, based in British Columbia, Canada, has produced the homoerotic horror movies The Brotherhood, Leeches! and Beastly Boyz. In 2007, DeCoteau and Rapid Heart worked on an adaptation of Edgar Allan Poe's "The Raven".

Rapid Heart movies are currently in distribution by Paramount Home Video, 20th Century Studios, Showtime, Blockbuster, HBO, Regent Entertainment, Here! TV, OutTV Canada, SciFi Channel, Full Moon Pictures and many others. 
 
Also available from Rapid Heart is the start of the Lesbian themed Witches of the Caribbean -- https://www.imdb.com/title/tt0396938/
and The Sisterhood -- https://www.imdb.com/title/tt0408191/

External links
The Video Graveyard: David DeCoteau: On Rapid Heart, Fake Names & B-Movies
David DeCoteau interview - MJSimpson.co.uk
 

Film production companies of Canada
Canadian film studios